Visions of Gandhi is the third studio album from underground hip hop group Jedi Mind Tricks, and their first album on the Babygrande record label. Jus Allah split from the group after the release of their album Violent by Design (2000), returning the group back to its original lineup of Vinnie Paz, Stoupe the Enemy of Mankind and DJ Drew Dollars. Producer Stoupe expands his dark sounds, including beats with grand orchestral samples and Latin-tinged production. Vinnie Paz lessens his lyrical topics to focus on his thug persona. Album guests include Canibus, Kool G Rap, Percee P, Ras Kass, and Tragedy Khadafi, as well as underground peers Crypt the Warchild, Planetary of OuterSpace, and Non Phixion members Ill Bill, Sabac Red, and Goretex.

Title significance
The album title was inspired by Foxy Brown's verse on the song "Affirmative Action" from Nas' 1996 album It Was Written, in which she raps "They praise Allah with visions of Gandhi". Vinnie Paz explained that it was "always something that stuck in my head but I never applied it to anything. Then I thought with everything going on in Palestine, the war with Iraq, Mumia's in jail. I just felt this is a time right now that the world and society need someone like Gandhi. So Visions of Gandhi just kind of reflects that."

Track listing

Charts

Notes 

 "Blood in Blood out" samples "Ki Esy Tha Fygeis" ("Και Συ Θα Φύγεις") by Tolis Voskopoulos, "Ego Trippin'" by Ultramagnetic MC's, "Lyrics of Fury" by Eric B. & Rakim, "I Don't Care" by Audio Two, "Flava in Ya Ear" by Craig Mack, and "Piosenka o sasiedzie" by Irena Santor
 "Animal Rap" samples "Coma" by Dave Grusin
 "The Rage of Angels" samples "Nothing Else" by Archive
 "Boondock Saints" samples "The Escape" by Burgess Meredith
 "A Storm of Swords" samples "La Cumparsita" by 101 Strings
 "The Wolf" samples sound effects, score and dialogue from the 2001 video game, Max Payne
 "Heart of Darkness" samples Mike's speech from Twin Peaks
 "Kublai Khan" samples "Winter Warz" by Ghostface Killah
 "Raw is War 2003" samples "Tu Voz" by Javier Solis

References

2003 albums
Jedi Mind Tricks albums
Babygrande Records albums
Cultural depictions of Mahatma Gandhi